Events from the year 1711 in France

Incumbents
 Monarch – Louis XIV

Events
3 April – Clipperton Island in the Pacific is rediscovered by Martin de Chassiron and Michel Du Bocage, who claim it for France and map it.
9 August–12 September – Siege of Bouchain (War of the Spanish Succession): the Duke of Marlborough breaks through the French lines.

Births
23 February – Louis de Brienne de Conflans d'Armentières, general (died 1774)
26 April – Jeanne-Marie Leprince de Beaumont, writer (died 1780)
22 May – Guillaume du Tillot, politician (died 1774)
7 June – François Jacquier, Franciscan mathematician and physicist (died 1788)
12 June – Louis Legrand, Sulpician priest and theologian (died 1780)
26 July – Jacques Hardouin-Mansart de Sagonne, architect (died 1778)
29 July – Claude-Adrien Nonnotte, writer (died 1793)
19 August – Gabriel de Solages, soldier and industrialist (died 1799)
2 September – Noël Hallé, painter, draughtsman and printmaker (died 1781)
23 September – Louis Nicolas Victor de Félix d'Ollières, Marshal of France (died 1775)
21 October – Armand-Jérôme Bignon, lawyer (died 1772)
25 December – Jean-Joseph de Mondonville, composer and violinist (died 1772)

Deaths

24 January – Jean Bérain the Elder, draughtsman, designer, painter and engraver (born 1640)
27 January – Antoine de Pas de Feuquières, soldier (born 1648)
26 February – Claude Frassen, theologian and philosopher (born 1620)
13 March – Nicolas Boileau-Despréaux, poet and critic (born 1636)
29 March – Gabriel Gerberon, Jansenist monk (born 1628)
11 April – François Lamy, Benedictine theologian (born 1636)
14 April – Louis, Grand Dauphin, son of Louis XIV (born 1661)
17 April – Louis Carré, mathematician (born 1663)
4 May – Princess Élisabeth Charlotte of Lorraine (born 1700)
31 August – Jean Le Pelletier, polygraph and alchemist (born 1633)
3 September – Élisabeth Sophie Chéron, painter, musician and poet (born 1648)
14 September – Claude Aveneau, missionary (born 1650)
30 November – Claudine Françoise Mignot, adventuress (born 1624)
Full date missing – Étienne Baudet, engraver (born 1636)

See also

References

1710s in France